Röhnisch is a surname. Notable people with the surname include:
Claudine Röhnisch, German nurse
Hellmut Röhnisch (1914-1996), German universal language activist